Bevin Boys were young British men conscripted to work in  coal mines between December 1943 and March 1948, to increase the rate of coal production, which had declined through the early years of World War II. The programme was named after Ernest Bevin, the Labour Party politician who was Minister of Labour and National Service in the wartime coalition government.

Chosen by lot as ten per cent of all male conscripts aged 18–25, plus some volunteering as an alternative to military conscription, nearly 48,000 Bevin Boys performed vital and dangerous civil conscription service in coal mines. Although the last ballot took place in May 1945 (shortly before VE Day), the final conscripts were not released from service until March 1948. Few chose to remain working in the mining industry after demobilisation; most left for further education or for employment in other sectors.

Bevin Boys were targets of abuse from the general public, who mistakenly believed them to be draft dodgers or cowards and they were frequently stopped by the police as possible deserters. Unlike those who had served in the military, Bevin Boys were not awarded medals for their contribution to the war effort and official recognition by the British government was only conferred in 1995.

Creation of programme

Shortfall in UK coal output

At the start of World War II, the UK was highly dependent on coal, not only to power ships and trains, but as the main source of energy for electricity generation. Although output from mines had increased as the world economy recovered from the Great Depression, it was in decline again by the time war broke out in September 1939.

At the beginning of the war the Government, underestimating the value of strong younger coal miners, conscripted them into the armed forces. By mid-1943 the coal mines had lost 36,000 workers, and they were generally not replaced, because other likely young men were also being conscripted to the armed forces.

Industrial relations were also poor: In the first half of 1942, there were several local strikes over wages across the country, which also reduced output. In response, the government increased the minimum weekly pay to 83 shillings (for those over the age of 21 working underground) and established a new Ministry of Fuel, Light and Power, under the leadership of Gwilym Lloyd George to oversee the reorganisation of coal production for the war effort. In late summer, a bonus scheme was proposed to reward workers in mines that exceeded their output targets. These measures resulted in an increase in production in the second half of 1942, although volumes were still short of the tonnage required.

Absenteeism (miners taking time off work as a result of e.g. sickness) also rose through the war from 9.65% in December 1941 to 10.79% and 14.40% in the Decembers of 1942 and 1943 respectively.

By October 1943, Britain was becoming desperate for a continued supply of coal, both for the industrial war effort and for keeping homes warm throughout the winter.

Appeals for volunteers

On 23 June 1941, Bevin made a broadcast appeal to former miners, asking them to volunteer to return to the pits, with an aim of increasing numbers of mineworkers by 50,000. He also issued a 'standstill' order, to prevent more miners being called up to serve in the armed forces.

On 12 November 1943, Bevin made a radio broadcast aimed at sixth-form boys, to encourage them to volunteer to work in the mines when they registered for National Service. He promised the students that, like those serving in the armed forces, they would be eligible for the government’s further education scheme.

The term 'Bevin Boys' is thought to originate from this broadcast.

Conscription
On 12 October 1943 Gwilym Lloyd George, Minister of Fuel and Power, announced in the House of Commons that some conscripts would be directed to the mines. On 2 December Ernest Bevin explained the scheme in more detail in parliament, announcing his intention to draft 30,000 men aged 18 to 25 by 30 April 1944.

From 1943 to 1945 one in ten of young men called up was sent to work in the mines. This caused a deal of upset, as many young men wanted to join the fighting forces and felt that as miners they would not be valued.

The first Bevin Boys began work, having completed their training, on 14 February 1944.

Programme

Selection of conscripts
To make the process random, one of Bevin's secretaries each week, from 14 December 1943, pulled a digit from a hat containing all ten digits, 0–9, and all men liable for call-up that week whose National Service registration number ended in that digit were directed to work in the mines, with the exception of any selected for highly skilled war work such as flying planes and in submarines, and men found physically unfit for mining. Conscripted miners came from many different trades and professions, from desk work to heavy manual labour, and included some who might otherwise have become commissioned officers.

An appeals process was set up, to allow conscripts the opportunity to challenge the decision to send them to the pits, although decisions were rarely overturned. Those who refused to serve in the mines were imprisoned. By 31 May 1944, 285 conscripts had refused to serve as miners, of whom 135 had been prosecuted and 32 had been given a prison sentence. By the end of November 1944, out of a total of 16,000 conscripts, 143 had refused to serve in the mines and had been sent to prison, some with the imposition of hard labour.

Training

Boys when they were nearly 18 years old received an official postcard instructing them in five days time to report to a training centre such as at Cresswell Colliery, Derbyshire.

Bevin Boys with no previous experience of mining, were given six weeks' training (four in a classroom-type setting and two at their assigned colliery). For their first four weeks of underground work, they were supervised by an experienced miner. With the exception of those working in the south Wales coalfields, the conscripts could not work at the coalface until they had accrued four months' experience underground.

For the most part, the Bevin Boys were not directly involved in cutting coal from the mine face, but acted instead as colliers assistants, responsible for filling tubs or wagons and hauling them back to the shaft for transport to the surface. Conscripts were supplied with helmets and steel-capped safety boots.

Pay and working conditions

Almost as soon as the first Bevin Boys had reported for training, there were complaints that their remuneration (44 shillings per week for an 18-year-old) were barely sufficient to cover living costs. Some 140 went on strike in Doncaster for two days before their training had finished. There were also complaints from experienced miners, who resented the fact that a 21-year-old recruit received the same minimum wage as they did.

Bevin Boys did not wear uniforms or badges, but the oldest clothes they could find. Being of military age and without uniform caused many to be stopped by police and questioned about avoiding call-up.

Contemporary attitudes to Bevin Boys

Many Bevin Boys suffered taunts as they wore no uniform, and there were accusations by some people that they were deliberately avoiding military conscription. Since a number of conscientious objectors were sent to work down the mines as an alternative to military service (under a system wholly separate from the Bevin Boy programme), there was sometimes an assumption that Bevin Boys were "Conchies". The right to conscientiously object to military service for philosophical or religious reasons was recognised in conscription legislation, as it had been in the First World War. However, old attitudes still prevailed amongst some members of the general public, with resentment by association towards Bevin Boys. In 1943 Ernest Bevin said in Parliament:

End of programme
The final conscription ballot took place in May 1945 (shortly before VE Day); however, the final conscripts were not released from service until March 1948.

Recognition of contribution to the war effort

Within a few months of the first Bevin Boys starting work, there were calls for a badge to be awarded in recognition of the importance of their national service.

After the war, Bevin Boys received neither medals nor the right to return to the jobs they had previously held. (Like Forces veterans, they were entitled to participate in the Government's Further Education and Training Scheme, which paid university fees and an annual means-tested grant of up to £426 to cover living expenses whilst studying.)

The role played by Bevin Boys in Britain's war effort was not fully recognised until 1995, 50 years after VE Day, when Queen Elizabeth II mentioned them in a speech.

On 20 June 2007, Tony Blair informed the House of Commons that thousands of conscripts who worked in mines during the Second World War would be awarded a veterans badge similar to the HM armed forces badge awarded by the Ministry of Defence. The first badges were awarded on 25 March 2008 by the then Prime Minister, Gordon Brown, at a reception in 10 Downing Street, marking the 60th anniversary of discharge of the last Bevin Boys. In 2010, Tom Hickman's "Called Up Sent Down": The Bevin Boys' War was published, containing accounts of around 70 of the boys sent to the coal mines.

  
On Tuesday 7 May 2013, a memorial to the Bevin Boys, based on the Bevin Boys Badge, was unveiled by the Countess of Wessex at the National Memorial Arboretum at Alrewas, Staffordshire. The memorial was designed by former Bevin Boy Harry Parkes; it is made of four stone plinths carved from grey Kilkenny stone from Ireland. The stone should turn black over time, to resemble the coal that the miners extracted.

The Bevin Boys Association is trying to trace all 48,000 Bevin Boy conscripts, optants or volunteers who served in Britain's coal mines during and after the war, from 1943 to 1948.

Notable Bevin Boys
Peter Archer, lawyer and Labour Party politician
Stanley Bailey, senior police officer
Stanley Baxter, actor and impressionist
John Comer, actor
Geoffrey Finsberg, Conservative politician
Roy Grantham, trade union leader
Paul Hamlyn, founder of the Hamlyn group of publishers and Music for Pleasure record label
Wally Holmes, rugby union player
Nat Lofthouse, footballer
Dickson Mabon, Labour politician
Tom McGuinness, artist
David McClure, artist
Eric Morecambe, comedian
Alun Owen, screenwriter
Kenneth Partridge, interior designer
Jock Purdon, folk singer/poet 
Peter Alan Rayner, numismatic author
Brian Rix, actor/manager, and President of Mencap
Peter Shaffer, dramatist 
Jimmy Savile, disgraced radio/television personality
Alf Sherwood, footballer
Gerald Smithson, cricketer

Bevin Boys Association
The Bevin Boys Association was formed in 1989 with a small membership of 32 in the Midlands area. By 2009 the membership had grown to over 1,800 from all over the United Kingdom and overseas.

Today the Bevin Boys Association continues to hold meetings and reunions as well as attending commemoration services.

The society produces a newsletter for all members.

In popular culture
Douglas Livingstone's radio play, Road to Durham, is a fictional account of two former Bevin Boys, now in their eighties, as they visit the Durham Miners' Gala.

British musician Jez Lowe wrote the song "The Sea and the Deep Blue Devil" from the perspective of a Bevin Boy who loses his girlfriend to a Royal Navy recruit.

English singer-songwriter Reg Meuross wrote a song called "The Bevin Boys (Bill Pettinger's Lament)". The song was commissioned by Martin Pettinger as a tribute to his Bevin Boy father, Bill.

See also
Unfree labour – a related, although different concept; labour in time of war or national emergency is specifically exempted from the category of 'unfree labour', as is work related to fulfilling a civic obligation.

References

External links

The Forgotten Conscript
Wartime Memories – Bevin Boys and their recognition
The Bevin Boys in Bures. Suffolk
A short film about the Bevin Boys
The Bevin Boys Official Association

 
Conscription in the United Kingdom
1940s in the United Kingdom
Coal mining in the United Kingdom
United Kingdom home front during World War II